The Saint-Étienne trolleybus system forms part of the public transport network of the city and commune of Saint-Étienne, in the Rhône-Alpes region of the Great South East of France.

In operation since 1942, the system is one of only three operating trolleybus systems in France; the others are the Limoges system and the Lyon system. Today, the city is taking major steps to develop trolleybus transport. New battery trolleybuses Solaris T12 with ŠKODA electric equipment were purchased. In addition, the number of vehicles was increased compared to the original fleet so that electric traffic could be resumed on the M7 Michon - city center - Bellevue line. In the near future, trolleybuses will also return to the M6 line serving the Metare housing estate, where a trolley line is now being built again. In addition, the line will use the planned BRT corridor and the carrier will purchase articulated trolleybuses for it. These should also appear on the M4 line.

Services
The current Saint-Étienne trolleybus line is:

 M3 : Cotonne – Hôtel de Ville – Terrenoire
 M7 : Michon – Hôtel de Ville – Bellevue

Trolleybus fleet

, the Saint-Étienne trolleybus fleet consisted of the following types:
 Solaris T12 (23 trolleybuses, nos. 131-153), entered service in 2019-2021

, the Saint-Étienne trolleybus fleet consisted of the following types:
 Berliet ER100 (5 trolleybuses, nos. 427, 430, 433, 436, 438), entered service in 1981 (in storage).
 Irisbus Cristalis ETB12 (11 trolleybuses, nos. 111-121), entered service in 2003.

See also

Gare de Saint-Étienne-Châteaucreux
List of trolleybus systems in France
Saint-Étienne tramway

References

External links

 Images of the Saint-Étienne trolleybus system, at railfaneurope.net
 
 

This article is based upon a translation of the French language version as at December 2011.

Saint-Etienne
Saint-Etienne
Transport in Saint-Étienne
1942 establishments in France